An annular solar eclipse occurred on November 12, 1947. A solar eclipse occurs when the Moon passes between Earth and the Sun, thereby totally or partly obscuring the image of the Sun for a viewer on Earth. An annular solar eclipse occurs when the Moon's apparent diameter is smaller than the Sun's, blocking most of the Sun's light and causing the Sun to look like an annulus (ring). An annular eclipse appears as a partial eclipse over a region of the Earth thousands of kilometres wide. Annularity was visible from the Pacific Ocean, Peru, Ecuador, Colombia and Brazil.

Related eclipses

Solar eclipses of 1946–1949

Saros 132

Tritos series

Metonic series

Notes

References

1947 11 12
1947 in science
1947 11 12
November 1947 events